Kai "Hiili" Hiilesmaa (born December 1966) is a Finnish record producer and musician. He is the vocalist of the rock band The Skreppers, former drummer of the doom metal band KYPCK and former keyboardist of the rock band Daniel Lioneye. He has worked with several internationally recognized rock groups, including his near 20-year association with Finnish band HIM.

Hiilesmaa began producing music professionally in 1995, recording with such bands as HIM, Amorphis and Apocalyptica. His trademarks include heavy, overdriven guitar sounds and experimental synthesiser programming. In 2013, Hiilesmaa addressed his preference for analog recording, saying "I prefer analog these days. Not only the sound, it asks more attitude to work with analog. Also you must make up your mind faster. There is no 'undo' in analog, which is often good."

Partial discography 
The 69 Eyes
Devils (2005)
Angels (2007)

Amorphis
"Elegy" (1995)
"My Kantele" (1997)
"Far from the Sun" (2003)

Ancara
 Chasing Shadows (2009)

Apocalyptica
Inquisition Symphony (1998)
"Cult" (2000)

Eilera
Precious Moment (2005)
Fusion (2007)

HIM
666 Ways to Love: Prologue (1996)
Greatest Love Songs Vol. 666 (1997)
Love Metal (2003)
And Love Said No: The Greatest Hits 1997–2004 (2004)
Venus Doom (2007)
Shatter Me with Hope (Sword of Democles version) from the "Heartkiller" CD single (2010)
"XX – Two Decades of Love Metal (2012)
Tears on Tape (2013)

Lordi
"The Monsterican Dream" (2004)

Moonspell
Darkness and Hope (2001)
The Antidote (2003)

Poisonblack
Of Rust and Bones (2010)

Ruoska
Rabies (2008)

Samantha Scarlette
Violent Delights + Violent Ends (2014)

Sentenced
"Crimson (1999)
"The Cold White Light" (2002)
"The Funeral Album" (2005)

References 

1966 births
Living people
Finnish record producers
21st-century Finnish male singers
Finnish heavy metal drummers
Finnish heavy metal singers
Finnish heavy metal keyboardists
20th-century Finnish male singers